"The Afterlife" is a song by American singer-songwriter Paul Simon from his twelfth studio album, So Beautiful or So What (2011). The song humorously describes a recently deceased individual standing in line to meet with his heavenly creator in Heaven.

The song peaked at number four on Billboard Adult Alternative Songs chart.

Background
The song concerns a man dying and getting to heaven, where he waits in line to meet with God, where everyone is "filling out forms and waiting in line to catch 'a glimpse of the divine.'" While in line, he unsuccessfully hits on a woman. When he finally meets God, he is taken aback, and can only spout gibberish.

Reception
Will Hermes of Rolling Stone gave the song four stars, commenting, "Packed with internal rhymes, Simon's verses flow like butter over supple lines by Cameroonian guitar master Vincent Nguini and Jim Oblon's syncopated grooves." Margaret Wappler of the Los Angeles Times praised the song as memorable, commending its "zydeco-inflected shuffle" and remarking, "According to Paul Simon, the afterlife is a bureaucratic bummer as bad as the DMV."

Track listing

Chart positions

Weekly charts

References

2011 singles
Paul Simon songs
Songs written by Paul Simon
Song recordings produced by Paul Simon
Song recordings produced by Phil Ramone
2011 songs